The Prince George's County Memorial Library System (PGCMLS) is the public library system of Prince George's County, Maryland, United States, in the Washington metropolitan area. Its headquarters are in the Largo-Kettering Branch in Largo.

Branches and offices 
There are 19 branch libraries in the Prince George's County Memorial Library System: Accokeek, Baden, Beltsville, Bladensburg, Bowie, Fairmount Heights, Glenarden, Greenbelt, Hillcrest Heights, Hyattsville, Largo-Kettering, Laurel, Mount Rainier, New Carrollton, Oxon Hill, South Bowie, Spauldings, Surratts-Clinton and Upper Marlboro. The South Bowie branch, the newest library in the county, opened in October 2012. PGCMLS also provides library service at the County Correctional Center.

Previously the library headquarters were in Hyattsville, adjacent to the Hyattsville Library.

History and organization 
The Library System was established in 1946 “...as a living memorial to those who have made the supreme sacrifice and a testimonial to all those who served in wars.”  The Laurel Branch was the first library to become part of the System, and the first county-built library was the Hyattsville Branch which housed the Library's Administrative Offices until 2015. In June of that year, the Administrative Offices were moved to the Largo-Kettering Branch. PGCMLS is governed by a Board of Library Trustees, appointed by the County Executive and approved by the County Council.

Community programs and services 

Some of the services offered by the Prince George's County Memorial Library System are: print, audio, video and electronic materials, storytimes and early literacy programs, programs for elementary school students, teens and adults, book discussions, the Summer Reading Program, author readings and presentations, public PCs and wireless access, electronic databases, technology for loan such as mobile hotspots and chromebooks, outreach services, books by mail, meeting and conference rooms, passport services, and volunteer opportunities.

Non-resident library privileges 
The library system is part of the Maryland Consolidated Library System, which provides that any person who is a resident of the State of Maryland may obtain a library card at no charge at any county library or Baltimore City. This privilege is also available to non-residents who work for an employer in Maryland or pay property taxes there. A person may apply for a card from any library system in the state, or choose to authorize a card from any other library system in the state on that system.

Non-residents who do not qualify may obtain a library card for a fee of $50 a year. An exception is made for residents of nearby jurisdictions outside of Maryland who will grant free library privileges to county residents, in which case the library will reciprocate. Thus, residents of the District of Columbia as well as the residents of the cities of Alexandria, Falls Church, and Fairfax, as well as the counties of Arlington and Fairfax in Virginia may obtain library cards at no charge.

Nearby public library systems

 Alexandria Public Library
 Anne Arundel County Public Library
 Arlington Public Library
 District of Columbia Public Library
 Fairfax County Public Library
 Howard County Public Library
 Montgomery County Public Libraries

References

Citations

Sources 

 Denny, George D., Nathania Branch-Miles, and Donna L. Schneider. "Quality of Life." Historic Prince George's County: A Confluence of Cultures. San Antonio, TX: Historical Network, 2011.
 Maryland State Archives. “Prince George’s County, Maryland – Executive Branch – Education.” Maryland Manual On-Line. Maryland State Archives, 20 Feb. 2013.
 Prince George's County Memorial Library System. “History of Prince George's County Memorial Library System.” Policy and Procedures Manual, 2003.

External links 

Prince George's County Library Federation records at the University of Maryland libraries

Public libraries in Maryland
Education in Prince George's County, Maryland
Libraries established in 1946
1946 establishments in Virginia